Lake Ōwhareiti is a lake in the Northland Region of New Zealand, South of Pakaraka.

See also
List of lakes in New Zealand

References

Owhareiti
Far North District